The Minister of Telecommunications and Postal Services was a Minister in the Cabinet of South Africa, established in 2014 by President Jacob Zuma, and combined into the Minister of Communications and Telecommunications in 2018 under President Cyril Ramaphosa.

References

External links
Department of Telecommunications and Postal Services

Lists of political office-holders in South Africa